Flumoxonide (developmental code name RS-40584) is a synthetic glucocorticoid corticosteroid which was never marketed.

References

Acetonides
Cyclohexanols
Corticosteroid cyclic ketals
Diketones
Fluoroarenes
Glucocorticoids